The 1989 Regal Scottish Masters was a professional non-ranking snooker tournament that took place between 13 and 17 September 1989 at the Scottish Exhibition Centre in Glasgow, Scotland.

Stephen Hendry won the tournament by defeating Terry Griffiths 10–1 in the final.

Main draw

References

1989
Masters
Scottish Masters
Scottish Masters